Nicholas Burtner is an American permaculturist and consultant. Based in the Dallas, Texas area, he has advised on many landscape projects involving the utilization of keyline design and climate-suitable plants. Since 2012, he has operated the School of Permculture, an educational and consulting firm. In addition, Burtner is a devout Christian, and says he builds his organization around Christ.

See also
Andrew Millison
Brad Lancaster

References

External links
School of Permaculture online
School of Permaculture on YouTube
Archive of articles authored by Burtner from PermacultureNews.org
Personal background of Burtner from PermacultureGlobal.org

Living people
Christians from Texas
People from Plano, Texas
People involved with desert greening
Permaculturalists
Year of birth missing (living people)